The Tellnes mine is one of the largest titanium mines in Europe. The deposit of titanium was discovered in 1954 and production at the mine began in October 1960.

References 

Titanium mines in Norway
Rogaland